Protoxaea gloriosa, the glorious protoxaea, is a species of bee in the family Andrenidae. It is found in Central America and North America.

References

Further reading

External links

 

Andrenidae
Articles created by Qbugbot
Insects described in 1893